Butterfly House, is a Mid-century modern style house located on Carmel Point in Carmel-by-the-Sea, California. Due to its unique wing-shaped roof, this building is commonly referred to as the Butterfly House. The house was designed and built by architect Francis W. Wynkoop. It is one of the few houses that is on the rocky Carmel shoreline. In 2011, the house was restored by the sons of the original architect, Frank Wynkoop. The Butterfly house is being offered for the fourth time since it was built in 1951.

History

The Butterfly House was designed and built by architect Francis W. Wynkoop (1902-1978). The site borders two lots at 26320 Scenic Road. Construction began in 1951 and was completed in 1952. The home has been featured numerous newspapers and magazines through the decades, such as The Californian on June 28, 1952, the National Geographic in 1954 and Trendsideas on November 7, 2011. 

The Butterfly House was built for $135,000. Wynkoop lived in the house with his wife and children until the death of his wife in 1953 and his father in 1954 caused him to sell the house in 1955. He sold it to lawyer and writer Steve B. Kahn, his wife Ruth and three children, who lived in the home for fifty years. It is one of five houses on the ocean front at Carmel Point. The Mrs. Clinton Walker House, designed by Frank Lloyd Wright in 1948 and completed in 1951 for Mrs. Clinton Della Walker of Pebble Beach.

Architectural style
The Butterfly House is a one and a half story, Mid-century modern-style building. It has a wing-shaped hipped roof, lifted to take advantage of the view. The house was built with a deck cantilevered out over solid granite rocks, at the edge of the breakers, with views of Point Lobos and Carmel Bay. The house had an U-shaped interior open courtyard and a kidney-shaped pool and hot tub. 

He used steel beams to support the roof that was lifted outward to give a sweeping view of the ocean. 18,000 pounds of steel are inside the home. The house is built of pumice block to blend into its surroundings.

Recent history

Recently the Butterfly House has been featured in several issues of the Architectural Digest magazines. The third owner, Joe Walter, purchased the property in 2008 and Wynkoop's sons, Thor and Jay Wynkoop, did the restoration of the home in 2010. They restored the home to many of its original features. Changes to the interior included a new rectangular pool, restoring the sunken floor and seating area in the living room, and adding new windows and glass sliding doors between the living room and pool. The flooring in the living areas and the exterior were replaced with limestone tiles.

The current owners, Kevin Comolli, and his wife Hannah, purchased the Butterfly House in 2014 for $16.5 million. They renovated the house with architect and designer Jamie Bush that took 2.5 years to complete. Bush told Architectural Digest "When you're in the living room, you feel like you're standing on the prow of a ship, with fog rolling in, seals swimming by, whales breaching, and pelicans alighting on the rocks. It's mesmerizing."

In August 2022, the Comolli's listed the property for $40 million.

Frank Wynkoop

Francis W. Wynkoop (1902–1978), also known as Frank Wynkoop, was an American architect, known for building oceanfront homes and as architect for the  Pacific Grove and the  San Carlos high school buildings.

Wynkoop was born on January 24, 1902, in Denver, Colorado. His father was Frances Murray Wynkoop (1869-1954) and mother was Leona Mehan (1880-1951). When he was eight years old, he lived with his parents in Vallejo, California. He had one son, Thor and one daughter with Adabelle May Roberts (1899-1953). He moved to Long Beach, California in 1924, where he and his family lived. In 1931, during the Great Depression in the United States, Wynkoop moved with his family to Seattle, Washington where he was a draftsman at the Metropolitan Building Company. In 1935, he moved to Fresno, California. By 1938, he had relocated with his family to Bakersfield, California where he a partner with Adams and Wynkoop, Architects. The firm designed several school buildings in southern California and war housing in Deride, California. In 1945, he was principal for the Frank Wynkoop and Associates, Architects in San Francisco.  

Wynkoop and his family moved to Carmel-by-the-Sea, California in the early 1950s. He designed two houses on the Carmel Point coastline. The Butterfly House was the first one, which was his own residence for several years. The second one is a mid-century modern Expressionist-style house that was built in 1953 at 26200 Scenic Road, which was influenced by Frank Lloyd Wright's organic architecture style. Wynkoop died on September 2, 1978, in Honolulu, Hawaii, at the age of 76.

Gallery

See also
Timeline of Carmel-by-the-Sea, California
List of Historic Buildings in Carmel-by-the-Sea

References

External links

Frank Wynkoop (Architectural Designer)

Modernist architecture in California
Houses completed in 1952
Houses in Monterey County, California
1952 establishments in California